Budun Khachabekovich Budunov (born 4 December 1975) is a former Russian professional football player.

He currently works as the president of the Dagestan's Football Union.

Honours
 Russian Cup finalist: 2001.
 Russian Third League Zone 1 top scorer: 1997 (35 goals).

Death of Serhiy Perkhun

On 19 August 2001, during a game against CSKA Moscow, Budunov had a head on head collision with goalkeeper Serhiy Perkhun, who sustained serious head trauma during the collision and died 9 days later from a brain hemorrhage. Budunov himself suffered a serious concussion and was treated in intensive care.

References

External links
 

1975 births
Living people
People from Kizilyurt
Russian footballers
Association football forwards
Russian Premier League players
FC Anzhi Makhachkala players
FC Moscow players
FC Tom Tomsk players
FC Akhmat Grozny players
Russian people of Dagestani descent
Sportspeople from Dagestan